FK Otrant-Olympic (Montenegrin: Fudbalski klub Otrant-Olympic, Albanian: Klubi Futbollistik Otrant-Olympic) is a Montenegrin football club based in the coastal town of Ulcinj. They compete in the Montenegrin Second League.

History
FK Otrant-Olympic is the first football club in Ulcinj, it was founded in 1921, under the name Olcinium. From 1921–1941, the team played only non-official games.After World War II, i.e. during SFR Yugoslavia era, the club played under the name Bjelogorac. From the 1970s, they played in the Fourth League - South (lowest rank). In 1977–78, under the name Ulcinj, the club achieved its highest success to date, finishing as runner-up in the Fourth League. That meant promotion to the Montenegrin Republic League.In 1983, the club was named Otrant, and after a few successful seasons, at the beginning of the 1990s, the club dissolved for one season. A new beginning came in the middle of the decade, and, until 2006, FK Otrant played in the Republic League, with frequent relegation.

Otrant achieved their greatest results in club history after Montenegrin independence. Within two seasons, they had won the Champions' title in Montenegrin Third League and since 2007, they played five seasons in the Montenegrin Second League. FK Otrant maintains the record of the highest win in the history of the Second League, winning 12–2 against Ribnica, on 20 May 2009.In 2013, Otrant was dismantled because of worsening finances. Ulcinj was represented in 2013–14 season of the Montenegrin Third League as Federal, a youth football club founded in 2010. On 22 July 2015, the club was renamed to Otrant-Olympic. The team soon made a comeback to the Montenegrin Second League, with notable results in 2016-17. FK Otrant finished in third place and the team participated in the First League playoffs, but lost against FK Rudar (1-0; 0-3).
Next two seasons, FK Otrant finished at the upper part of Second League’s table, but without another battle for promotion in the playoffs. Bad days came on season 2019-20, as FK Otrant finished at the bottom of the table. With that result, team from Ulcinj was relegated, after four consecutive seasons spent in second-tier.

Seasons

Honours and achievements
Montenegrin Third League
Champions (2): 2006–07, 2015–16, 2021–22
Montenegrin Fourth League
Champions (5): 1989–90, 1991–92, 1996–97, 2001–02, 2005–06
Southern Region Cup
winners (1): 2006

Current squad

Stadium

FK Otrant plays its home games at Stadion Olympic, with a capacity of 1,500 seats. The stadium was built by the Adriatic Sea, on the longest sandy beach in Montenegro - Velika Plaža.

See also
Ulcinj
Montenegrin Second League
Montenegrin clubs in Yugoslav football competitions (1946–2006)

External links
 Profile by Football Association of Montenegro
 Profile by Weltfussballarchiv

References

Football clubs in Montenegro
Sport in Ulcinj